Steven William Victor (born September 6, 1980) is a Haitian-American record executive, artist manager, music publisher, and A&R representative. He is the founder & CEO of Victor Victor Worldwide and SVP of A&R at Universal Music Group. He formerly served as COO of GOOD Music and EVP & Head of A&R at Def Jam Recordings.

He works closely with a number of artists, including Kanye West, Pusha T and The-Dream, among others. He has also managed The-Dream, Desiigner, Tyga, CashMoneyAP, 16yrold and Pop Smoke among others. He currently reports directly to Universal Music Group chairman and chief executive officer Sir Lucian Grainge.

Early life and education
Steven William Victor was born on September 6, 1980 in the Brooklyn borough of New York City, where he was also raised. He grew up in a multi-family home with his parents and older sister, along with his father's brother and sister's families. He attended Morehouse College in Atlanta from 1998 to 2002, where he graduated with a bachelor's degree in English and Psychology.

Career
Victor began his career in 2003 with an internship at Interscope Records, to which he was later promoted to publicity assistant in 2004, working in public relations for six years. During his tenure at Interscope, he met American rapper and record executive Pusha T, which at the time was one-half of the hip hop duo Clipse. He formed a mutual relationship with Pusha, becoming the publicist and manager for Clipse, and later solely Pusha. In late 2015, Pusha T became president of GOOD Music, with Victor becoming COO of GOOD. In late 2016, he was appointed SVP of A&R at Universal Music Group, while simultaneously holding his position at GOOD. At this time he also started to manage Tyga, The-Dream, and Desiigner, the latter of whom he formerly signed to GOOD and Def Jam Recordings. He also founded his record label and music publishing company Victor Victor Worldwide as a joint venture with Universal in late 2016. In October 2017, he was named EVP & Head of A&R at Def Jam, reporting to then-CEO Paul Rosenberg and replacing his position as SVP of A&R at Universal. In August 2019, he left Def Jam and transitioned back to his previous position at Universal, focusing on his label's joint venture with them.

Victor Victor Worldwide

Victor Victor Worldwide Inc. (formerly d/b/a as Victor Victor Records or simply Victor) is an American record label and music publishing company founded on November 3, 2016 in New York City by Steven Victor, who is also the CEO. It is a joint venture between the label and Universal Music Group, giving Victor Victor the power to sign an artist to a joint venture recording contract with their label and any other label under the Universal umbrella. Victor Victor also has the same joint venture structure with Universal Music Publishing Group for their publishing entity, effectively making the label and publishing company subsidiaries of UMG as a whole.

Notable acts signed to Victor Victor include the late American rapper Pop Smoke and rapper Ski Mask the Slump God, both of whom are concurrently signed to Republic Records. Victor Victor has also notably signed record producers 16yrold, CashMoneyAP, and YoungKio (with Cash Gang) on the publishing side (concurrently with UMPG). Former notable artists signed to the label include American rapper D Savage, who was initially signed to Victor Victor and Republic and later jointly with Capitol Records and Virgin Music before departing.

Victor Victor also runs the management firm William Victor Management Group, managing artists Pusha T, The-Dream, CashMoneyAP, and 16yrold, among others. A majority of the artists signed to the label are managed by the firm itself.

In June 2020, the label launched a philanthropic division titled the "Victor Victor Foundation", with Victor pledging to donate $1 million to it. Victor himself also donated $25,000 to the "Fund for Public Schools", a nonprofit organization in New York City.

The label's logo, designed by Japanese fashion designer and label signee Nigo, features the Tosa, a rare Japanese dog breed that is mainly used for Japanese dog fighting.

Roster

Recording

Current

Former

Publishing

In-house producers

Notes

References

American music industry executives
American people of Haitian descent
Morehouse College alumni
Living people
American music managers
1980 births